Paul Annesley Gore ( – 1780) was an Irish  politician. He was the second son of Sir Arthur Gore, 2nd Baronet, and Elizabeth Annesley, and younger brother of Arthur Gore, 1st Earl of Arran.

He sat in the House of Commons of Ireland, as a Member of Parliament for 
Mayo from 1751 to 1760,
and for Sligo County from 1765 to 1768.

References 
 

1700s births
Year of birth uncertain
1780 deaths
Irish MPs 1727–1760
Irish MPs 1761–1768
Members of the Parliament of Ireland (pre-1801) for County Mayo constituencies
Members of the Parliament of Ireland (pre-1801) for County Sligo constituencies
Paul Annesley